Articlave is a village and townland in County Londonderry, Northern Ireland. It is on the main A2 coastal road, 7 kilometres west of Coleraine. In the past the area has been spelt as Ardacleve or Ardacleave. It is situated within the Causeway Coast and Glens district.

Demographics

2011 Census
On Census day in 2011, the population of Articlave was 922. Of these:
24.3% were aged under 16 years and 15.3% were aged 65 and over
48.8% were male and 51.2% were female
12.5% were from a Catholic background and 82.5% were from a Protestant background

2001 Census
Articlave is classified as a Small Village or Hamlet by the NI Statistics and Research Agency (NISRA) (i.e. with population between 500 and 1,000 people). On Census day (29 April 2001) there were 800 people living in Articlave. Of these:
26.0% were aged under 16 years and 14.9% were aged 60 and over
49.5% of the population were male and 50.5% were female
18.1% were from a Catholic background and 79.2% were from a Protestant background
6.5% of people aged 16–74 were unemployed.

References 

Villages in County Londonderry
Causeway Coast and Glens district